Milltown is a Gaelic Athletic Association club in Milltown, County Kildare, Ireland which played a leading role in developing the games in the county.

History
Milltown won the Junior Championship in 2008 defeating Robertstown by a single point. Emmet Mullhall is Milltown's most famous present player, having been a member of the Kildare panel on the county's last appearance in an All-Ireland final in 1998. Colin O'Shea, a real star for the future, played in the 2009 Minor Leinster final.

At some underage grades Milltown, along with Allenwood, Ballyteague & Robertstown, form part of the highly successful combined Parish of Allen club, Na Fianna.

Milltown have been affiliated to the GAA since 1888, and have affiliated each year since. This makes it the oldest club still in continuous existence in County Kildare.

Adding to their history, the Milltown U21s team were the first 21s team of Milltown to win a Championship Title in November 2017.

Achievements
 Jack Higgins Cup (1) 1967
 Kildare Intermediate Football Championship: (1) 1972
 Kildare Junior Football Championship: (2) 2008, 2018

Bibliography
 Red Sashes and Proud Hearts: 125 Years of Milltown GAA, by Ronan Byrne (2013)
 Kildare GAA: A Centenary History, by Eoghan Corry, CLG Chill Dara, 1984,  hb  pb
 Kildare GAA yearbook, 1972, 1974, 1978, 1979, 1980 and 2000- in sequence especially the Millennium yearbook of 2000
 Soaring Sliothars: Centenary of Kildare Camogie 1904-2004 by Joan O'Flynn Kildare County Camogie Board.

External links
Milltown GAA club site
Milltown GAA's Facebook page
Milltown GAA on Twitter
Kildare GAA site
Kildare GAA club sites
Kildare on Hoganstand.com

References

Gaelic games clubs in County Kildare
Gaelic football clubs in County Kildare